Laccophilus oscillator is a species of predaceous diving beetle in the family Dytiscidae. It is found in North America and the Neotropics.

Subspecies
These two subspecies belong to the species Laccophilus oscillator:
 Laccophilus oscillator laevipennis Sharp, 1882
 Laccophilus oscillator oscillator Sharp, 1882

References

Further reading

 
 

Dytiscidae
Articles created by Qbugbot
Beetles described in 1882